Joanna L. Laynesmith (née Chamberlayne) is a scholar of medieval studies, focusing on medieval queenship. Her book: The Last Medieval Queens: English Queenship 1445-1503 (Oxford University Press) jointly won the Longman-History Today Book of the Year Prize in 2005 and the Women's History Network (UK) Book Prize in 2004.

She obtained her doctorate (her thesis on English queenship, 1445–1503) from University of York's Centre for Medieval Studies in 1999, and has taught at York, Reading and Oxford Universities.

She is married to the Reverend Mark Laynesmith (né Smith).

Publications
J. L. Laynesmith: The Last Medieval Queens: 1445-1503 (Oxford University Press, 2004)
J. L. Laynesmith: Cecily Duchess of York (Bloomsbury, 2017)

External links
 Women's History Network
 Author's Website

British historians
Alumni of the University of York
Living people
Year of birth missing (living people)